Torn Banner Studios Inc. is a Canadian video game developer based in Toronto.

History 
Torn Banner Studios was founded in 2010 by Steve Piggott of Team Chivalry, the development team of Age of Chivalry, a 2007 mod for Half-Life 2. The studio's first game was Chivalry: Medieval Warfare; after a successful kickstarter campaign raising $85,934 it was released independently in October 2012. The game received the 2012 "Indie of the Year" award from Indie DB. Sega released Torn Banner's NeverMine in July 2016 as part of the Help: The Game collection, with proceeds going to the War Child charity.

Games developed

References

External links 
 

2010 establishments in Ontario
Canadian companies established in 2010
Companies based in Toronto
Video game companies established in 2010
Video game companies of Canada
Video game development companies